In the 2011–12 season of competitive football (soccer) in Cape Verde:

Diary of the season
November 25: Celtic FC and GD Varanda, clubs of Praia's neighborhood of Achadinha de Baixo northwest of the center played a match in honor of Djack
December 2: the 2011–12 Santiago Island League (South) season began
February 11: Sporting Praia made a scoreless draw with Boavista Praia
February 26: Juventude in Sal celebrated their 50th anniversary
April 1: SC Santa Maria celebrated their 75th anniversary
Académica do Porto Novo won the Porto Novo Cup and qualified into the Cape Verdean Cup
Académico do Aeroporto defeated Académica do Sal to claim their super cup title for Sal
Juventude da Furna won their cup title for Brava and qualified into the Cape Verdean Cup
CD Onze Unidos won their cup title for Maio and qualified into the Cape Verdean Cup
GD Palmeira won the 2012 Sal Island Cup and qualified into the Cape Verdean Cup
April 29: all qualifiers listed into the Cape Verdean football championships.
May 5:
Cape Verdean Football Championships begun
Sporting Praia defeated Juventude Sal 6-1 and made it the highest scoring match of the season, also it was one of tour with the highest goal difference which was five
May 12: Mindelense defeated Sal Rei's Académica Operária 5-0 and made it the second match with the highest goal difference of five
May 13: Sporting Praia defeated Académica Brava 5-0 and made it the third match with the highest goal difference
May 27: Estrela dos Amadores of Tarrafal, Santiago defeated Académica Brava 5-0 and made it the fourth match with the highest goal difference
June 3: Regular season ends, Sporting Praia, Académica Fogo, SC Atlético and Académica Porto Novo qualified into the semis
June 10: the Semifinals started
June 17: Sporting Praia and SC Atlético qualified into the finals
July 1: No finals competition due to the 2012 local elections that took place
July 7: Sporting Praia claimed their ninth and recent title for the club
late-August: Onze Unidos won their only Cape Verdean Cup title.  This was the recent Cape Verdean Cup held

Final standings

Cape Verdean Football Championships

Sporting Praia and SC Atlético each had 15 goals and were the first in each group, second placed Group A club Académica do Fogo had eight points and eleventh in the total of goals with three.  Académica of Porto Novo, second in Group B had ten points and scored ten goals.  The top four advanced into the semis, Sporting Praia and SC Atlético advanced with four goals scored.  Sporting Praia won under the away goals rule in the first match and Sporting Praia claimed their ninth and recent title for the club.  Sporting Praia later qualified into the first national Super Cup in the following year.

Group A

Group B

Final Stages

Leading goalscorer: Gerson (SC Atlético) - 13 goals

Cape Verdean Cup

The fourth Cape Verdean Cup took place.  This was the first edition that all eleven participants participated, the cup winners from Boa Vista and Brava competed. Onze Unidos won their only cup title after defeating Académica do Porto Novo 2–1 in extra time. The next edition would take place in 2018.

Participants
Juventude do Norte, winner of the Boa Vista Island Cup
Juventude da Furna, winner of the Brava Island Cup
Valência FC do Fogo, winner of the Fogo Island Cup
Onze Unidos, winner of the Maio Island Cup
Juventude, winner of the Sal Island Cup
Boavista Praia, winner of the Santiago South Cup
Paulense, winner of the Santo Antão North Cup
Académica do Porto Novo, winner of the Santo Antão South Cup
FC Ultramarina, winner of the São Nicolau Cup
Batuque, winner of the São Vicente Cup

Island or regional competitions

Regional Championships

Regional Cups

Regional Super Cups
The 2011 champion winner played with a 2011 cup winner (when a club won both, a second place club competed).

Regional Opening Tournaments

Transfer deals

Summer/Fall 2011
 Figo from Estrela dos Amadores (Tarrafal) to  Tourizense
 Mailó from FC Ultramarina to CS Mindelense
 Vozinha from Sporting Praia to  Progresso Sambizanga

In early and mid 2012
 Mailó from CS Mindelense to  Leixões S.C.

Retirements
 Caló (Sporting Praia)

See also
2011 in Cape Verde
2012 in Cape Verde
Timeline of Cape Verdean football

Notes

References

 
 
2011 in African football
2012 in association football